Cejle is a municipality and village in Jihlava District in the Vysočina Region of the Czech Republic. It has about 500 inhabitants.

Administrative parts
The village of Hutě is an administrative part of Cejle.

References

Villages in Jihlava District